This is a list of the tallest structures in New Zealand.  It includes all structures to their highest point however building heights listed are only to the Architectural height and non architectural features on buildings are not included in their height.

Tallest existing structures

Demolished structures

Proposed structures

Abandoned proposals

See also
 List of tallest buildings in Auckland
 List of tallest buildings in Wellington
 List of tallest buildings in Christchurch
 List of tallest buildings in Oceania

References

Lists of tallest buildings in Oceania
New Zealand
Tallest